(stylized as eyelis) is a Japanese music group signed to Geneon Universal Entertainment then moved to Warner Bros. Home Entertainment Japan in 2015. The group consists of Satomi Kawasaki on keyboard, Takeshi Masuda on guitar and Wataru Maeguchi on strings.

History
Eyelis' first single, "Can't Take My Eyes Off You", was released on November 14, 2012 and is used as the opening theme for the eponymous third season of Hayate the Combat Butler. Their second single, was released on December 19, 2012, and contains two songs that were used in two OVAs of The World God Only Knows. In 2015, they started new activities under new label Warner Bros. Home Entertainment and released their new single  which is used as ending theme for the anime television series Akagami no Shirayukihime.

Members

Discography

Albums

Singles

References
General

DTM Magazine July 2012 issue
Otona Anime Vol.26
LisAni! Character Song separate Vol.10.1

Specific

External links
Official blog 
Official YouTube channel
Wataru Maeguchi's official website 

2012 establishments in Japan
Hayate the Combat Butler
Musical groups established in 2012
NBCUniversal Entertainment Japan artists
Anime musical groups